The 2014 LSA Adult State Cup  is a qualifying tournament that will determine which clubs from Louisiana will qualify for the 2014 USASA Region III National Cup. The LSA Adult State Cup began on March 14, 2014 and ended on May 16, 2014.

Group stage

Group A

Group B

Final round

3rd place game

(F)=Forfeited
 Winner of 3rd Place game advances to the 2014 Region III Amateur Cup

Final

References

United States Adult Soccer Association